Wedding of the Weddings is an annual meeting of couples who had non-alcoholic wedding receptions. The meetings have taken place in various cities of Poland since 1995. The couples come together with their children to have an all-night-long non-alcoholic dancing party, to exchange experience on organizing non-alcoholic parties for children, youth and adults and just to spend several days together enjoying the local culture.

The event 
Wedding of the Weddings is a multi-layered event. There are conferences usually held at a local university, with invited talks by researchers on family related issues (relationship in the marriage, growing up children, non-alcoholic weddings and other family feasts) and with contributions of participants. There are meetings and discussions with representatives of the local government who are responsible for family support and for alcohol-related problems. A rich social program is offered: sports, sightseeing tours, field trips and picnics. Performances of folk singers and folk dancers as well as of pop stars accompany the meetings.

The major event of each Wedding of the Weddings follows a traditional wedding rite. In the evening, there is a Holy Mass at the local cathedral, where a bishop blesses each couple after confirmation of the marital oath. After that there is a wedding parade through the streets of the town to the restaurant, where a reception takes place. The reception starts with a polonaise, an old Polish aristocratic dance, lasting until 4:00 am with dancing and games for participants led by professional entertainers.

History 
The Reverend Władysław Zązel, provost of a small parish in Kamesznica, became famous for spreading the tradition of non-alcoholic wedding receptions. In his parish, more than 90% of all wedding receptions were celebrated without alcohol. In 1995, he was invited by Radio Maryja (a well-known Catholic radio station) to tell the listeners about his experience with alcohol-free weddings. Listeners from all Poland were calling the radio station to say that alcohol-free weddings were organized by many individuals. Father Zązel proposed then to organize a meeting of those who had non-alcoholic weddings. The meetings were called "Wedding of the Weddings".

The first two such meetings were organized in Father Zązel's parish Kamesznica, then in Zamość, Częstochowa, Kraków, Białystok, Koszęcin, Ludźmierz, Warszawa, Olsztyn, Wrocław, Bydgoszcz, Tarnów, Łomża, Miejsce Piastowe, Radom, Kraków, Wieleń Zaobrzański and again Kamesznica,  then in Krynica-Zdrój and Myczkowce. The 2017 event took place in Trąbki Wielkie and Gdańsk, while the 2018 meeting was hosted by Ludźmierz. In 1999, Father Zązel went with alcohol-free couples to Rome, where they were blessed by Pope John Paul II.

Speakers and preachers 
Among the speakers, who usually come from the local communities, there also some prominent and well-known ones in Poland, such as:
 Cardinal Archbishop Franciszek Macharski of Kraków,
 Cardinal Archbishop Stanisław Dziwisz of Kraków,
 Cardinal Zenon Grocholewski from Vatican,
 Archbishop Wojciech Ziemba of Białystok,
 Archbishop Edmund Michał Piszcz of Warmia,
 Archbishop Józef Michalik of Przemyśl, President of Polish Bishop Conference,
 Archbishop Stanisław Gądecki of Poznań,
 Archbishop Marek Jędraszewski of Kraków,
 Bishop Jan Tyrawa of Bydgoszcz,
 Bishop Stanisław Stefanek of Łomża,
 Bishop Antoni Pacyfik Dydycz of Drohiczyn,
 Bishop Henryk Tomasik of Radom,
 Bishop Andrzej Jeż of Tarnów,
 Bishop Jan Wątroba of Rzeszów,
 Bishop Edward Materski from Radom,
 Bishop Józef Zawitkowski from Łowicz,
 Bishop Marian Duś from Warszawa,
 Bishop Jan Szkodoń from Kraków,
 Bishop Grzegorz Ryś from Kraków,
 Bishop Andrzej Siemieniewski from Wrocław,
 Bishop Wiesław Lechowicz from Tarnów,
 Bishop Tadeusz Bronakowski from Łomża,
 Bishop Kazimierz Górny of Rzeszów,
 Bishop Adam Szal from Przemyśl,
 Bishop   Piotr Greger from Bielsko-Biała/Żywiec,
 Bishop  Wiesław Szlachetka from  Gdańsk,
 Pater professor Jacek Hadryś, theologist, Poznań University,
 Pater professor Karol Meissner, specialist on sexology,
 Pater professor Aleksander Posacki, specialist of demonology, occultism and sects,
 Pater professor Janusz Królikowski, specialist of dogmatic theology,
 Pater Leon Knabit,  specialist of theology
 Pater Jan Reczek,  specialist on internal healing
 Pater Dr. Marcin Kołodziej, specialist on liturgy
 Pater Dr. Franciszek Płonka, specialist on liturgy
 Pater Józef Walusiak, specialist on addiction curation
 Professor Andrzej Urbaniak, computer scientist, Poznań University of Technology,
 Professor Zofia Włodarczyk, specialist on botany, biblical biology and gardening, Hugon Kołłątaj Agricultural University of Cracow,
 Dr. Mieczysław Guzewicz, doctor of theology, specialist on marriage issues
 Dr. Andrzej Dakowicz of University of Białystok,
 Dr. Krzysztof A. Wojcieszek, of the Bogdan Janicki University psychologist,
 Dr. Eng. Antoni Zieba, of the  Kraków University of Technology, engineer,
 Dr. Andrzej Gołębiowski, of Radom University of Technology,
 Dr. Eng. Jacek Pulikowski, of the Poznań University of Technology,
 Dr. Marek Babik, from the Kraków Ignatianum University, specialist on  child rearing processes,
 Dr. Stanisław Bogaczewicz, Institute of National Memory, historian,
 Mr. Krzysztof Brzózka, from The National Agency for Alcohol Problems Solution (PARPA)
 Mr. Andrzej Wronka, specialist on Catholic apologetics, and many other.[1]

Artists 
Folk singers and dancers as well as orchestras from Polish mountains (Gorals) are accompanying practically all the meetings. Folk groups from other regions appear occasionally as well like from Kujawy, Kurpie, Radom area or Silesia. But also (former or current) pop stars come frequently to give concerts, for example Magda Anioł and her band, Antonina Krzysztoń, Viola Brzezińska with the 'New Day' group as well as Jarosław Wajk, a former vocalist of  the "Oddział Zamknięty" rock band,
and Jan Budziaszek of the Skaldowie band.

Alcohol-free weddings 
A central reason for the Wedding of the Weddings event is the general resistance in Poland (and also in other countries) against weddings where no alcohol is served. To combat the feeling of being strangers to this culture and in Polish society, many of those couples seeking alcohol-free weddings also sought out other like-minded people with whom to socialize and celebrate.

The non-alcoholic weddings differ from the ones where alcohol is served. The wedding ceremony is usually extended by the reading of a special blessing (and acknowledgement) from the local bishop. Through this, the wedding reception does not only become exceptional because of the absence of alcohol and everything associated with alcohol, but it is also marked by other traditions and attractions. As toasts in Poland  are almost by definition associated with alcohol, they are either removed entirely or replaced by table speeches, goat's milk toasts, songs in honor of the married couple and their parents and so on. As Polish wedding receptions are usually all night long events, usually the alcohol goes some way into keeping the guests awake and amused late at night. A non-alcoholic wedding differs significantly from this as dishes are served regularly, must be of comparable quality all the time, the orchestra has to play all the time and the party is enriched by various group dances such as the polonaise, line dances, "travel dances", skill dances (zorba, mountain folk dances), games and competitions for the participants. Usually professional entertainers, who undertook special courses for non-alcoholic party entertainment ( wodzirej) are employed during the reception to organize and run the entertainment program.

The vast majority of non-alcoholic weddings are organized by free-choice abstinents (not to be confused with recovering alcoholics). It is a matter of lifestyle, not of medical treatment.

Non-alcoholic lifestyle 
Another aspect shared by the participants of the Wedding of the Weddings is the non-alcoholic lifestyle. All family parties, like the ones connected to birthdays or name days of the parents or children, meetings with friends or friends of children, New Year parties, church-associated celebrations (baptism, first communion, wedding, funeral) are organized without alcohol.

Moreover, the couples and their children are also frequently engaged in some abstinence societies.

References 

Marriage in the Catholic Church
Polish culture
Pre-wedding
Temperance movement
Alcohol in Poland